Nick Williams (born November 23, 1990) is a former American football wide receiver. He played college football at Connecticut. He was signed by the Washington Redskins as an undrafted free agent during the 2013 offseason.

Professional career

Washington Redskins
The Washington Redskins signed Williams as an undrafted free agent on April 28, 2013. He was released during final cuts, but signed to the practice squad a few days later. On November 8, Williams was promoted to the active roster in place of Chris Thompson. He made his NFL debut in Week 11 against the Philadelphia Eagles, where he had a five-yard reception and scored a two-point conversion.

Williams was signed to the team's practice squad on August 31, 2014, after being waived the day before. He was waived by the team on September 9, 2014.

Atlanta Falcons

On February 24, 2015, Williams signed with the Atlanta Falcons. Williams played in 14 games with the Falcons in 2015, catching 17 passes for 159 yards and two touchdowns.

On September 4, 2016, Williams was released by the Falcons and was signed to the practice squad the next day. He was promoted to the active roster on December 9, 2016.

Williams was inactive for the Falcons' 34–28 overtime loss to the New England Patriots in the Super Bowl.

Williams only played in one game for the Falcons in 2017, recording three receptions for 30 yards in a Week 4 loss to the Buffalo Bills.

Tennessee Titans
On May 16, 2018, Williams signed with the Tennessee Titans. He was released on September 1, 2018. He was re-signed on September 18, 2018. Following a Week 5 game in which he dropped a potential go-ahead touchdown from Marcus Mariota, Williams was released by the Titans on October 9, 2018.

Los Angeles Rams
On October 16, 2018, Williams was signed by the Los Angeles Rams. He was released on November 30, 2018.

Denver Broncos
On July 26, 2019, Williams was signed by the Denver Broncos. He was released on August 26, 2019.

San Francisco 49ers
On August 27, 2019, Williams was signed by the San Francisco 49ers. He was placed on injured reserve on August 31. He was released from injured reserve with an injury settlement on September 6.

Personal life
Williams grew up in East Windsor, New Jersey and played high school football at the Hun School of Princeton.

Williams was a pre-kinesiology major while at University of Connecticut.

References

External links
 Connecticut Huskies bio

1990 births
Living people
American football return specialists
American football wide receivers
Atlanta Falcons players
UConn Huskies football players
Hun School of Princeton alumni
People from East Windsor, New Jersey
People from Hightstown, New Jersey
Players of American football from Connecticut
Sportspeople from Mercer County, New Jersey
Tennessee Titans players
Washington Redskins players
Los Angeles Rams players
Denver Broncos players
San Francisco 49ers players